George Howard "Chief" Johnson (March 20, 1886 – June 11, 1922) was an American professional baseball pitcher. He played three seasons in Major League Baseball (MLB), from 1913 to 1915, for the Cincinnati Reds of the National League and Kansas City Packers of the Federal League. He surrendered the first home run in the history of Wrigley Field, to Art Wilson on April 23, 1914.

Johnson was of Ho-Chunk, French and Irish ancestry. He identified as Ho-Chunk and was depicted in the media as a Native American. A 1913 feature by Ripley's Believe It or Not! reported his full name as George Washington Murphy Johnson.

Johnson was shot to death in Des Moines, Iowa, on June 11, 1922, at the age of 36. He had been in town to host a medicine show and had gotten into an argument during a dice game. The shooter, despite having confessed to police and being identified by witnesses, was eventually acquitted of first degree murder.

References

External links

1886 births
1922 deaths
Baseball players from Nebraska
Cincinnati Reds players
Deaths by firearm in Iowa
Ho-Chunk people
Kansas City Packers players
Lincoln Railsplitters players
Major League Baseball pitchers
American murder victims
Nebraska people of French descent
People murdered in Iowa
San Francisco Seals (baseball) players
Sioux City Packers players
St. Joseph Drummers players
Vernon Tigers players
1922 murders in the United States
20th-century Native Americans